Jamil Hassan was the head of the Syrian Air Force Intelligence Directorate and a close adviser to President Bashar al-Assad. He is reported to be under house arrest.

Career
Hassan was appointed head of the Syrian Air Force Intelligence Directorate in 2009.

Sanctions
Hassan was sanctioned by the European Union on 9 May 2011. He was added to the European Union's sanction list on the grounds that he "involved in violence against the civilian population" during the Syrian civil war. On 29 June 2011, the United States also sanctioned him due to his involvement in human rights abuses in Syria.

Reports of assassination
According to Free Syrian Army reports he was assassinated on 26 August 2012 by an aide, who was an operative of the Ahfad al-Rasul Brigade. However, Al Dunya, a pro-government TV channel, denied this report the same day.

Hassan gave an interview for The Independent in November 2016, proving the claims of his death false. He stated that the tactics used in the 1982 Hama revolt would have ended the Syrian Civil War much faster.

Criminal investigations
In June 2018 German news magazine Der Spiegel reported, that Germany's chief federal prosecutor has issued an international arrest warrant against Hassan because of charges of crimes against humanity.

In November 2018, French prosecutors issued international arrest warrants for three senior Syrian intelligence and government officials: Ali Mamlouk, Abdel Salam Mahmoud and Jamil Hassan. The warrants bring charges including collusion in torture, forced disappearances, crimes against humanity and war crimes.

See also
 Air Force Intelligence Directorate
 Syrian Armed Forces
 Syrian civil war

References

Living people
People of the Syrian civil war
Syrian generals
Syrian Alawites
1952 births